The Portsmouth A's were a minor league baseball team based in Portsmouth, Ohio. From 1948 to 1950, the A's played as exclusively as members of the Class D level Ohio-Indiana League and were a minor league affiliate of the Philadelphia Athletics. The Portsmouth A's hosted minor league home games at Riverside Park, known today as Branch Rickey Park. The A's won the 1949 league pennant.

History
The Portsmouth A's were immediately preceded by the Portsmouth Red Birds, who played as members of the Middle Atlantic League from 1937 to 1940 as an affiliate of the St. Louis Cardinals.

In 1948, the Portsmouth A's were formed, serving as a minor league affiliate of the Philadelphia Athletics. Portsmouth became members of the eight–team Class D level Ohio–Indiana League. Portsmouth joined the Lima Terriers, Marion Cubs, Muncie Reds, Newark Yankees, Richmond Braves, Springfield Giants and Zanesville Dodgers in beginning league play on May 15, 1948.

In their first season of play, Portsmouth A's placed 2nd in the Ohio–Indiana League regular season standings. The A's ended the 1948 season with a record of 82–58, as George Staller served as manager. Portsmouth finished a mere 0.5 game behind the 1st place Zanesville Dodgers in the final standings. In the playoffs, the Muncie Packers swept Portsmouth 4 games to 0.

The 1949 Portsmouth A's won the Ohio–Indiana League pennant before losing in the playoffs. Playing under manager Homer Cox, Portsmouth placed first in the regular season standings with a 81–58 record. Portsmouth finished 4.5 games ahead of the 2nd place Springfield Giants. In the 1st round of playoffs, the Marion Red Sox defeated the A's 3 games to 1.

In their final season, the Portsmouth A's did not qualify for the 1950 playoffs to defend their championship. The Portsmouth A's ended their final Ohio–Indiana League season with a 46–89 record to place 7th. Walter Van Grofski served as manager, as Portsmouth finished 42.5 games behind the 1st place Marion Red Sox. The A's scored 568 total runs, last in the league.

In 1951, the Portsmouth A's did not return to play, as the Ohio–Indiana League reduced from eight teams to six teams.

Portsmouth was without minor league baseball until the 1993 Portsmouth Explorers began a three–season tenure as members of the Frontier League.

The ballpark
The Portsmouth A's hosted minor league home games at Riverside Park. The ballpark was renamed "Branch Rickey Park" in 1950. The ballpark was constructed in 1935 and is still in use today, as home to the Shawnee State Bears collegiate team. The location is 25 Mary Ann Street.

Timeline

Year–by–year records

Notable alumni

Hilly Flitcraft (1948)
Dutch Romberger (1948–1949)
George Staller (1948, MGR)

See also
Portsmouth A's players

References

External links
Baseball Reference

Defunct minor league baseball teams
Professional baseball teams in Ohio
Defunct baseball teams in Ohio
Baseball teams established in 1948
Baseball teams disestablished in 1950
1948 establishments in Ohio
1950 disestablishments in Ohio
Philadelphia Athletics minor league affiliates
Portsmouth, Ohio
Ohio-Indiana League teams